Sandrine Doucet (10 September 1959 – 4 February 2019) was a French politician. As a member of the Socialist Party, she served as a Deputy between 2012 and 2017, representing Gironde's 1st constituency.

Citing health reasons, Doucet did not seek re-election in 2017. She died of cancer at age 59 on 4 February 2019.

References

1959 births
2019 deaths
Deputies of the 14th National Assembly of the French Fifth Republic
People from Talence
Politicians from Nouvelle-Aquitaine
Socialist Party (France) politicians
Deaths from cancer in France